The 1900 Michigan gubernatorial election was held on November 6, 1900. Republican nominee Aaron T. Bliss defeated Democratic candidate William C. Maybury with 55.75% of the vote.

General election

Candidates
Major party candidates
Aaron T. Bliss, Republican
William C. Maybury, Democratic
Other candidates
Frederic S. Goodrich, Prohibition
Henry Ramsay, Socialist Democrat
Henry Ulbricht, Socialist Labor
Daniel Thompson, People's
Hazen S. Pingree, Socialist Democrat

Results

References

1900
Michigan
Gubernatorial
November 1900 events